Saint-Bonnet-de-Valclérieux is a former commune in the Drôme department in southeastern France. On 1 January 2019, it was merged into the new commune Valherbasse.

Population

See also
Communes of the Drôme department

References

Former communes of Drôme